is a Japanese voice actress and singer from Kitakyushu who is affiliated with Amuse. She began her activities in 2016 after passing an audition, and played her first main role as Mari Tachibana in the anime television series Back Street Girls in 2018. She is also known for her roles as Aria Futaba in Aikatsu Stars!, Yomi Takeda in Tamayomi, and Shizuku Ōsaka in Love Live! Nijigasaki High School Idol Club.

Biography
Maeda was born in Kitakyushu on April 25, 1996. As a child she was interested in fantasy, and she would write stories while she was in elementary school. During her high school years, she had an interest in music, and was a member of a band that covered songs by LiSA, Chatmonchy, and other artists. Her interest in voice acting began when she read the manga Voice Over! Seiyu Academy; she was also influenced by her enjoyment of plays from an early age.

In 2016, Maeda participated in a voice acting audition, where she won the grand prize. She began her acting career the following year after becoming affiliated with the talent agency Amuse. Among her earliest roles were Aria Futaba in the anime television series Aikatsu Stars! and Nice Nature in the multimedia franchise Uma Musume Pretty Derby. In 2018, she played Mari Tachibana in the anime series Back Street Girls and Selka Zuberg in Sword Art Online: Alicization. In 2019, she played Yuzu Midorikawa in Kandagawa Jet Girls. In 2020, she played Yomi Takeda in the anime series Tamayomi and Shizuku Ōsaka in Love Live! Nijigasaki High School Idol Club.

On November 25, 2022, she made her solo singer debut under Amuse Inc. with her debut single , releasing on March 15, 2023. The song was used at the opening theme song for the anime, Saving 80,000 Gold in Another World for My Retirement.

Personal life
Maeda is ambidextrous. She previously worked part-time at a Mister Donut outlet, and cites "Mister Donut fortune telling" as one of her hobbies.

Filmography

TV Anime
2017
Aikatsu Stars! as Aria Futaba

2018
Uma Musume Pretty Derby as Nice Nature
Back Street Girls as Mari Tachibana
Sword Art Online: Alicization as Selka

2019
Kemono Friends 2 as Giant Panda
The Magnificent Kotobuki as Miyuri
Fruits Basket as Chie
Kandagawa Jet Girls as Yuzu Midorikawa
Aikatsu on Parade! as Aria Futaba

2020
Interspecies Reviewers as Thies
Tamayomi as Yomi Takeda
Umayon as Nice Nature
Love Live! Nijigasaki High School Idol Club as Shizuku Ōsaka

2021
Combatants Will Be Dispatched! as Cristoseles Tillis Grace
Night Head 2041 as Shо̄ko Futami
Assault Lily Fruits as Kanaho Kon
The Way of the Househusband as Cheering Child A
Platinum End as Mimi Yamada

2022
Miss Kuroitsu from the Monster Development Department as Tōka Kuroitsu
Love Live! Nijigasaki High School Idol Club 2nd Season as Shizuku Ōsaka
Onipan! as Momozono-Momo

2023
Don't Toy with Me, Miss Nagatoro 2nd Attack as Orihara
Saving 80,000 Gold in Another World for My Retirement as Sabine
I Got a Cheat Skill in Another World and Became Unrivaled in the Real World, Too as Lexia Von Arcelia
Isekai Shōkan wa Nidome Desu as Elka

Films
2021
Hula Fulla Dance as Ohana Ka'aihue

Video games
2020
Kandagawa Jet Girls as Yuzu Midorikawa
Show by Rock!! as Reppanyo
Kirara Fantasia as Utsutsu Sumeragi
2022
Two Jong Cell!! as Haru Ichinose
Goddess of Victory: Nikke as Poli
2023
Dead or Alive Xtreme Venus Vacation as Yukino

References

External links
Agency profile 
Official website 
Official artist website 

1996 births
Amuse Inc. talents
Japanese voice actresses
Nijigasaki High School Idol Club members
Living people
Voice actresses from Fukuoka Prefecture
Voice actors from Kitakyushu
Japanese women pop singers
21st-century Japanese singers
21st-century Japanese women singers
Anime singers
Amuse Inc. artists
A-Sketch artists